Sir Clive Alderton  (born 9 May 1967) is a British diplomat and courtier who has served as Private Secretary to King Charles III and Queen Camilla since 8 September 2022. He previously served them in their capacity as Prince of Wales and Duchess of Cornwall.

Biography 
Alderton was educated at Abingdon School. He joined the Foreign Office in 1986 and subsequently served in various diplomatic posts in Poland, Belgium (European Union), Singapore and France.

In 2006, he was appointed Deputy Private Secretary to Prince Charles and his wife, and he was promoted to Private Secretary for Foreign and Commonwealth Affairs to Their Royal Highnesses in 2009.  In 2012, he took up an appointment as ambassador to Morocco and simultaneously non-resident ambassador to Mauritania.

He was appointed principal private secretary to the Prince of Wales and Duchess of Cornwall on 5 February 2015. He served in that position until the Prince's accession to the throne as King Charles III on 8 September 2022, following the death of his mother, Queen Elizabeth II.

On 13 September 2022, Alderton was sworn as a member of the Privy Council of the United Kingdom. On 20 October 2022, he attended the Privy Council as one of the King's Private Secretaries. 

Alderton is also a Trustee of the Prince of Wales's Charitable Fund.

Honours
Alderton was appointed Lieutenant of the Royal Victorian Order (LVO) in the 2013 New Year Honours, Commander of the Royal Victorian Order (CVO) in the 2019 Birthday Honours and Knight Commander of the Royal Victorian Order (KCVO) in the 2022 Birthday Honours. He is a recipient of both the Queen Elizabeth II Diamond Jubilee Medal and the Queen Elizabeth II Platinum Jubilee Medal.

On 13 September 2022, he was sworn in as a member of His Majesty's Most Honourable Privy Council entitling him to the prefix "The Right Honourable" for life.

References

1967 births
Living people
People educated at Abingdon School
Ambassadors of the United Kingdom to Morocco
Ambassadors of the United Kingdom to Mauritania
Private Secretaries to the Sovereign
Members of the Household of the Prince of Wales
Members of the British Royal Household
Knights Commander of the Royal Victorian Order
Members of the Privy Council of the United Kingdom